The São Paulo FC Youth Squads are the youth academy of São Paulo FC, a Brazilian football club based in São Paulo. The youth sector is composed of various squads divided by age groups. All the youth teams currently train at the club's main training ground, CFA Cotia, located in the municipality of Cotia. The U-20 squad currently plays in the Campeonato Brasileiro Sub-20, the Copa do Brasil Sub-20 and the Copa São Paulo de Futebol Júnior. São Paulo FC's Youth Squads of all categories have won trophies at national and international level.

Academy Graduates
Academy Graduates currently in activity.

Europe

Asia

America

Brazil

Honours

Junior

Official Competitions

Torneio Blue Star/Mundial FIFA Sub-20 (2): 1999, 2000.
Copa Libertadores Sub-20 (1): 2016
Copa São Paulo de Futebol Júnior (4): 1993, 2000, 2010, 2019
Copa do Brasil Sub-20 (#): 2015, 2016, 2018
Campeonato Paulista de Juniores Sub-20 (7): 1969, 1987, 1995, 1999, 2000, 2011, 2016

International Friendly Competitions

Dallas Cup - Mundial Sub-19 (Super), Estados Unidos: 1995, 2007, 2009.
Weifang Cup (潍坊杯) - Sub-18, China: 2013.
Torneio Internacional de L'Aculdia, Espanha: 2001.
Torneio Centenário de Juniores, México: 2000.
Torneio Centenário de Juniores, Holanda: 2000.
Torneio da Páscoa de Juniores, Alemanha: 2000.
Torneio Victor Benitez Morales, Peru: 2000.
Torneio Internacional de Monthey, Suíça: 1999, 2000.
Copa Rider Sweet - Latino-Americana, Chile: 1995.
Torneio Internacional de Niigata, Japão: 1995.
Torneio Internacional de Croix, França: 1993.

National Friendly Competitions

Taça Belo Horizonte de Juniores, Sub-20: 1987, 1997.
Copa Ipiranga RS (antigo Campeonato Brasileiro Sub-20): 2015, 2016.
Copa Ouro da APF (Associação Paulista de Futebol): 2015, 2016.
Taça Governador de Roraima, Roraima: 1995.
Copa Brasil 500 anos: 1999.
Torneio Eduardo José Farah: 1997.
Taça Cidade Promissão, São Paulo: 1995.
Jogos Abertos do Interior - Campinas, São Paulo: 1994.
Jogos Regionais - São Manoel, São Paulo: 1994.
Campeonato Metropolitano: 1980.
Torneio de Preparação da Categoria Júnior: 1981.

Juvenil 

Official Competitions

Mundial Sub-17 FIFA - Troféu Quixote, Espanha: 2007, 2008.
Copa do Brasil Sub-17: 2013.
Campeonato Paulista Juvenil: 1942, 1946, 1954 (A), 1954 (B), 1955 (A), 1956 (A), 1964, 1969, 1970, 1973, 1976, 1979, 1982, 1990 (GSP), 1991, 1991 (GSP), 1995, 2006, 2015 e 2016.

International Friendly Competitions

Torneio Bicentenário da Independência, México: 2010.
Torneio Internacional de Zayed, Emirados Árabes: 2008.
Desafio Pelé Internacional - Sheffield, Inglaterra: 2007.
Torneio Internacional de Águas de Lindóia, Brasil: 2004.
Torneio Internacional Athletic Club de Bilbao, Espanha: 2003.
Torneio Brasil-Japão: 1996, 1999, 2002.
Brazil Cup - Poços de Caldas, Brasil: 2001.
Torneio Centenário Ajax, Holanda: 2000.
Torneio Internacional de Gradisca, Itália: 1998.
Copa Caribe, México: 1995.
Al Wahda Cup, Emirados Árabes: 1994.

National Friendly Competitions

Taça Belo Horizonte de Futebol Sub-17: 2016.
Copa Ouro da APF: 2016 e 2017.
Salvador Cup: 2016.
Mongeral Aegon Future Cup - Fase Nacional: 2013.
Copa 2 de Julho, Bahia: 2011.
Copa Zico: 2002.
Troféu Marcelo de Castro Leite: 1974.
Taça COFI - Copa Dr. Paulo Birolli Neto - Uchôa, São Paulo: 1990, 1992.
Campeonato Metropolitano: 1990, 1991.
Troféu Milton Barreiros: 1981.
Taça Bandeirantes: 1952.
Taça Avany Viana: 1941.
Taça Oriental: 1939.

Infantil 

Official Competitions

Campeonato Paulista Infantil, Sub-15: 1955, 1963, 1973, 1976, 1978, 1984, 1989, 1990 (GSP), 1992, 1995, 1997, 1999, 2007, 2008 e 2014.

International Friendly Competitions

Mundial Sub-15 Copa Nike - Manchester United Premier Cup, Inglaterra: 2009.
Mundial Sub-14 Copa Nike, Portugal: 2002.
Campeonato Sulamericano Sub-15: 1992, 1993, 1995.
Copa Mercosul Sub-15: 2001.
Torneio Brasil-Japão Sub-15: 2000, 2007, 2009.
Torneio Internacional de Windenbück Sub-15, Alemanha: 1995.
Torneio Internacional Rolando Marques - São Bernardo do Campo, Brasil: 1995, 1996.
Torneio Internacional de Tóquio, Sub-14: 2009.
Fair Play do Torneio Internacional de Tóquio, Sub-14: 2009.
Copa Internacional Governador Luiz Antônio Fleury Filho: 1992.

Competições Amistosas Nacionais

Campeonato Brasileiro Sub-15 (Copa do Brasil, Votorantim): 1991, 1992, 2013, 2014 e 2016.
Campeonato Brasileiro Sub-15 (Copa do Brasil, Londrina): 2008.
Campeonato Brasileiro Sub-14/15 Copa Nike, Setor Nacional: 1998, 2002, 2006, 2007, 2009.
Campeonato Paulista Sub-14/15 Copa Nike, Setor Estadual: 2007.
Torneio Nacional de Integração, Infantil: 1974.
Copa dos Campeões Associação Paulista de Futebol, Sub-14: 2002.
I Copa Metropolitana, Sub-14: 2001.
Campeonato do DEFE, Sub-14: 2000.
Campeonato Metropolitano, Sub-15 (Infantil 2º Ano): 1990, 1992.
Torneio de Verão da Cidade de Votorantim, São Paulo: 1992.
Taça Empresa de Ônibus Rosa, Tatuí, Infantil: 1986.
Torneio Presidente Laudo Natel, Cotia, Sub-14: 2015
Torneio Interclubes Sub-14, Cotia: 2015

Mirim 

Official Competitions

Campeonato Mundial Sub-12 - Shizuoka, Japão: 2004.
Campeonato Paulista, Dente de Leite: 1991.
Taça São Paulo, Dente de Leite: 1986, 1987.
Campeonato Metropolitano, Sub-14 (Infantil 1º Ano, Dente de Leite): 1992.

Friendly Competitions

Peace Cup Sub-13 - Shenyang, China: 2016.
Gothia Cup Sub-13 - Shenyang, China: 2016.
Campeonato Base Brasil 2020: 2015.
I Copa Internacional Mirim - Pardinho, São Paulo: 1992.
Copa Integração de Futebol, Dente de Leite - São Carlos, São Paulo: 1988.
Torneio Pelé, Dente de Leite: 1987.
II Copa Jales, Dente de Leite: 1987.
Copa São Carlos, Dente de Leite: 1986, 1987.
Torneio Início do Campeonato Paulista, Dente de Leite: 1987.
Taça Empresa de Ônibus Rosa, Tatuí, Dente de Leite: 1986.
Troféu Hélio Marchesi, Dente de Leite: 1973.
Taça Júlio Damião, Dente de Leite: 1970.
Troféu TV Tupi, Dente de Leite: 1970.
Taça João Nobilo, Mirim: 1953.

References

youth squads
Football academies in Brazil